Alana Hawley Purvis, sometimes credited as Alana Hawley, is a Canadian actress from Vancouver, British Columbia. She is most noted for her performance as Frankie in the 2021 film Range Roads, for which she received a Canadian Screen Award nomination for Best Actress at the 10th Canadian Screen Awards in 2022.

She previously appeared in The Valley Below, a 2014 film by Range Roads director Kyle Thomas.

Filmography

Film

Television

References

External links

21st-century Canadian actresses
21st-century Canadian comedians
Canadian film actresses
Canadian television actresses
Actresses from Vancouver
Living people
Year of birth missing (living people)